Dixon Alan Hays is a politician who was elected Supervisor of Elections for Lake County, Florida, in 2016. He previously was a member of the Florida State Senate from 2010 to 2016 and a member of the Florida House of Representatives from 2004 to 2010. He is a Republican.

History
Hays was born in Henderson, Kentucky, and moved to Florida in 1950. He attended Connors State College, located in Warner, Oklahoma, where he received his bachelor's degree in 1967. After that, he joined the United States Coast Guard, where he was a dental technician from 1967 to 1970. Hays later attended the University of Florida College of Dentistry, from which he graduated in 1976. He settled in Umatilla, Florida, and served on the Lake-Sumter State College Board of Trustees for six years.

Florida House of Representatives
In 2004, when the incumbent State Representative Carey Baker declined to seek re-election so that he could instead run for the Florida Senate, Hays ran to succeed him in the 25th District, which stretched from Howey-in-the-Hills to Debary and included parts of eastern Lake County, northwestern Seminole County and southern Volusia County. He faced Larry Metz, Johnny Smith, Randy Wiseman and JoAnn Huggins in the Republican primary. Hays was narrowly victorious over his opponents, receiving 35% of the vote to Metz's 29%, and advanced to the general election, where he was elected overwhelmingly over only write-in opposition. He was re-elected without opposition in 2006 and 2008. During a 2010 debate over legislation that required a woman to undergo an ultrasound before receiving an abortion, Hays controversially compared abortion to the Holocaust before he was cut off by the then-Speaker of the Florida House of Representatives, Larry Cretul, which prompted a Jewish member of the House to object.

Senate
When Carey Baker, whom Hays had succeeded in the House in 2004, decided not to run for re-election to his seat in the Florida Senate, Hays ran to fill the open seat in the 20th District, which included Lake County, southern Marion County, northwestern Seminole County, northern Sumter County and western Volusia County. He won the Republican primary unopposed and, in the general election, faced Eunice Garbutt, the Democratic nominee, whom he defeated with 67% of the vote.

In 2012, the state's legislative districts were redrawn and Hays was moved into the 11th District, where he opted to seek re-election and which contained most of the territory that he had previously represented. He was opposed by the independent candidate John Iler, and campaigned on making Florida "a business-friendly state" by cutting regulations, improving education, speeding up the process for permits to be granted, keeping taxes low and creating an internet sales tax. Once again, Hays was re-elected comfortably, receiving 72% of the vote to Iler's 28%.

Supervisor of Elections 
Following court-ordered redistricting in 2016, Hays opted not to run for re-election in his reconfigured Senate district, but instead to run for Lake County Supervisor of Elections, which was being vacated by the long time Supervisor Emogene Stegall. Hays won the general election with 55% of the vote, leading Democrat Christopher Flint with 32% and no-party-affiliation candidate Scott Larson with 12%.

Controversies
In 2011, during Florida's redistricting, Hays was heavily criticized when he made the statement, "We all know there are many Hispanic-speaking people in Florida that are not legal [...] and I just don't think it's right that we try to draw a district that encompasses people that really have no business voting anyhow." His suggestion of a racially based double standard led to statewide criticism from fellow senators, representatives and the media.

During the 2013 legislative session, Hays sponsored legislation that would have banned public buses from stopping on streets after an incident in which he was driving behind a bus that pulled off on the side of the road to load and unload passengers, and he was unable to pull around it, which an Orlando Sentinel columnist called "absurd".

In 2014, Hays wrote legislation that was signed into law by Governor Rick Scott that "gives county school districts final responsibility for selecting instructional materials", allowing parents to protest textbooks at public hearings on the basis that some books "unfairly presented foreign cultures and doctrines...in public schools".

In July 2014, Hays announced his intention to introduce a bill requiring that all Florida public school students in middle or high school watch Dinesh D'Souza's film America unless their parents objected.

References

External links
 Florida State Senate - Alan Hays
 Florida House of Representatives - Alan Hays
 Alan Hays for Senate
 

|-

|-

|-

University of Florida alumni
1946 births
Republican Party members of the Florida House of Representatives
Living people
People from Umatilla, Florida